Paul Géroudet (1917–2006) was a notable Swiss ornithologist. He was the chief editor of Nos Oiseaux from 1939 to 1994.

References

1917 births
2006 deaths
Swiss ornithologists
20th-century Swiss zoologists